is an automotive tuning company from Tomisato, Chiba Prefecture, Japan founded by Isami Amemiya. Amemiya has made a name for himself tuning rotary engines since 1974 and has become a pioneer in tuning rotary-powered Mazdas. Thirty years later, first on the street and later in the Super GT series, Amemiya has left its mark in the tuning and motorsports worlds for rotaries.

Motorsport 

RE Amemiya's cars are often featured on the Japanese show Hot Version. Hot Version often shows Keiichi Tsuchiya and other professional drivers competing in Touge events; these events are run in a cat and mouse fashion, much like the form of racing seen in the Initial D franchise. RE Amemiya's RX-7 often battles with the Amuse S2000, the J's Racing S2000 and the MCR R34 GT-R. RE Amemiya's RX-7 held the title of Touge Monster from 2004 to 2007, when it went against J's Racing at the Touge GP 2007 event with a new blue FD3S RX-7 which had revised side-ports and a single aftermarket turbine setup; this car lost its title as the battle conditions were in the rain. The new machine was built after almost losing to Amuse's S2300 GT-1 with their boost-up turbine blue FD3S during Touge GP 2006. The company reclaimed its Touge title after winning against J's Racing's Honda S2000 in 2009 with their green FD3S. Thus far, RE Amemiya has won the Touge Monster title three times, each with a different car.

In addition to competing in tuner events, in 1995 his company RE Amemiya (RE for Rotary Engine) began its participation as the lone rotary entry in the Super GT series with a 3-rotor 20B-powered Mazda RX-7 in the GT300 class. This car was featured in Polyphony Digital's Gran Turismo series. In 2006 the team was rewarded when they captured the class championship. RE Amemiya would go on to achieve more success over the following seasons including 3 more race wins and achieving 11 podiums. in 2009 RE Amemiya would finish 2nd in the GT300 championship narrowly being beaten by the Racing Project Bandoh Lexus IS350 in the championship. in their final season in Super GT, RE Amemiya finished 3rd in the GT300 Championship behind Hasemi Motorsport and Autobacs Racing Team Aguri respectively.

The company also have competed in the D1 Grand Prix drifting series since 2004. For their second year of competition (2005), their driver Masao Suenaga, scored a sole victory at Fuji Speedway, but finished as runner up overall in the Grand Prix, losing by just one point to Yasuyuki Kazama.

Complete Super GT results 
(key) (Races in bold indicate pole position) (Races in italics indicate fastest lap)

References

External links 
 RE Amemiya official home page
 Supercars.net GT300 car
 HDR photos of an RX-7 RE Amemiya

Mazda vehicles
Automotive companies of Japan
Companies based in Chiba Prefecture
Japanese auto racing teams
Mazda
Super GT teams
Japanese brands